Bernard Parmalee (born September 16, 1967) is an American football coach who is the running backs coach for the Jacksonville Jaguars of the National Football League (NFL). He previously served as the special teams coordinator for the Atlanta Falcons in 2020 and also served as an assistant coach for Oakland Raiders, Kansas City Chiefs and Miami Dolphins.

Parmalee played college football as running back at Ball State, where he was inducted into the Hall of Fame in 2001, and was signed by the Miami Dolphins as an undrafted free agent in 1992. Playing for nine seasons in the NFL, Parmalee also played for the New York Jets.

Playing career
Parmalee played high school football at Lincoln High School in Jersey City, New Jersey.  Parmalee played in college at Ball State University, where he is the 3rd leading rusher all-time and was named MAC Freshman of the Year in 1987.

Parmalee played running back for the Miami Dolphins and the New York Jets from 1992 to 2000. Parmalee's professional opportunity came when he tried out for the Miami Dolphins after working for UPS. He played seven seasons with the Dolphins (1992–98) in 104 games, scoring fifteen rushing touchdowns and three receiving touchdowns while rushing for 1,959 yards and amassing 1,306 receiving yards. In 1999, he went to the Jets and played two seasons in 30 games with two rushing touchdowns, 220 rushing yards, and 179 receiving yards.

Coaching career

Miami Dolphins
Parmalee coached both special teams and tight ends for the Miami Dolphins from 2002 to 2004.

Notre Dame Fighting Irish
Parmalee coached both special teams and tight ends for the Notre Dame Fighting Irish from 2005 to 2009. Irish tight ends did well under Parmalee's tutelage having produced multiple John Mackey Award finalists during his tenure (Anthony Fasano and John Carlson).

Kansas City Chiefs
The Chiefs announced him as their Tight Ends coach on February 1, 2010.

Oakland Raiders
He was hired by the Raiders as their new running backs coach on January 25, 2015. In Parmalee's first season in Oakland, Latavius Murray made the Pro Bowl, running for 1066 yards — the team's first 1000-yard rusher in five years. In Parmalee's second season in Oakland, the Raiders had the league's 6th ranked rushing attack. As Jon Gruden took over as head coach of the Raiders after the 2017 season, Parmalee was ousted with most of the Raiders coaching staff.

Atlanta Falcons
In 2018, Parmalee was hired to be the running backs coach for the Falcons. He coached Ito Smith in his first season where he tallied four running touchdowns, the most rushing touchdowns by a Falcons rookie since 2002. After working as an offensive assistant and assistant special teams coach to start the 2019 season, he returned to being the running backs coach on November 4.

On October 12, 2020, Parmalee was shifted from running backs coach to special teams coordinator, as part of a midseason shakeup of the coaching staff.

Jacksonville Jaguars
On February 10, 2021, Parmalee was hired by the Jacksonville Jaguars as their running backs coach under head coach Urban Meyer.

On February 17, 2022, he was retained under new head coach Doug Pederson.

References

External links
Jacksonville Jaguars profile
 Atlanta Falcons profile
 Kansas City Chiefs profile
 

1967 births
Living people
African-American coaches of American football
African-American players of American football
American football running backs
Atlanta Falcons coaches
Ball State Cardinals football players
Ball State University alumni
Jacksonville Jaguars coaches
Kansas City Chiefs coaches
Lincoln High School (New Jersey) alumni
Miami Dolphins coaches
Miami Dolphins players
New York Jets players
Notre Dame Fighting Irish football coaches
Oakland Raiders coaches
Players of American football from Jersey City, New Jersey
Sportspeople from Jersey City, New Jersey
21st-century African-American sportspeople
Ed Block Courage Award recipients